Ankwicz is a Polish-language surname of nobility belonging to the coat of arms .
Historical feminine forms: Ankwiczówna (unmarried, from father's surname), Ankwiczowa (married; from husband's surname).

 Andrzej Alojzy Ankwicz  (1777–1838), archbishop
 Józef Ankwicz (1750–1794), castellan, Sejm deputy
 Krystyna Ankwicz (1907–1985), Polish film actress
  (1810–1879), Polish countess

Polish-language surnames